Miren Ortubay Fuentes (Vitoria, 1958) is a Spanish lawyer and criminologist, as well as a professor at the University of the Basque Country (UPV/EHU), specializing in gender-related violence and prisoners' rights.

Biography
Ortubay Fuentes graduated in law from the University of Deusto in 1980, and holds a Ph.D. in law from the same university. Her 1994 doctoral thesis was entitled, . She holds a diploma in Criminology from the Complutense University of Madrid, and did postgraduate studies in criminology at the university of Louvain-la-Neuve (Belgium).

After completing her education, Ortubay Fuentes began her career as a lawyer. In 1982, she was the co-founder of Salaketa, the association of support to prisoners, located in Vitoria.

Ortubay Fuentes is a full professor at UPV/EHU in the Faculty of Law and the Faculty of Social Work. She teaches, among others, the subject Violence against Women: Prevention and Intervention.

Ortubay Fuentes, Lohitzune Zuloaga, and Estíbaliz de Miguel have participated together in the  study  (Experience of Police Detention of Women in the Autonomous Community of the Basque Country).

Awards and honours
 2019, III Menina Basque Country Awards to people committed to the eradication of gender-based violence in its various manifestations

Selected works
 Tutela penal de las condiciones de trabajo : un estudio del artículo 311 del Código penal, 2000  
 Prisión y alternativas en el nuevo Código Penal tras la reforma 2015, 2016

References

1958 births
Living people
Academic staff of the University of the Basque Country
People from Vitoria-Gasteiz
University of Deusto alumni
Complutense University of Madrid alumni
Spanish lawyers
Spanish criminologists
Gender studies academics
Penologists